The Embassy of Tunisia in Washington, D.C. is the diplomatic mission of the Tunisian Republic to the United States. It is located at 1515 Massachusetts Avenue NW in Washington, D.C., on the east side of Scott Circle and on the eastern edge of Embassy Row. The Ambassador is Faycal Gouia.

In 2009, U.S. Secretary of State Hillary Clinton participated in an iftar with the Ambassador of Tunisia.

References

External links
 
 

Tunsia
Washington, D.C.
Tunisia
Tunisia–United States relations